Maa Mahamaya Ambikapur Airport or Ambikapur Airport is located at Darima,  south of Ambikapur, in Chhattisgarh, India. The air strip is used mainly for small aircraft and helicopters. The airstrip was upgraded at a cost of Rs. 3 crore to  category 2C to enable operations of 40-50 seater aircraft.

Airlines and destinations
No scheduled airlines serve this airport as of now.

References 

Defunct airports in India
Airports in Chhattisgarh
Airports with year of establishment missing